Zsolt Gyulai (born 12 September 1964) is a Hungarian sprint canoeist. He competed at 1988, 1992 and 1996 Olympics and won four medals: two gold (1988: K-1 500 m, K-4 1000 m) and two silver (1992: K-1 500 m, K-4 1000 m). He also won fourteen medals at the world championships: six golds (K-1 1000 m: 1989, K-4 1000 m: 1986, 1987, 1989, 1990, 1991), four silvers (K-1 500 m: 1986, K-2 500 m: 1995, K-4 1000 m: 1993, 1995), and four bronzes (K-1 500 m: 1991, K-2 200 m: 1995, K-2 500 m: 1991, K-4 500 m: 1993).

Gyulay was elected President of the Hungarian Olympic Committee (MOB) on 29 January 2022, succeeding Krisztián Kulcsár. He took the position on 1 February 2022, shortly before the start of the 2022 Winter Olympics.

Awards
 Hungarian kayaker of the Year (3): 1988, 1989, 1992
 Order of Merit of the Hungarian People's Republic – Order of Stars (1988)
   Order of Merit of the Republic of Hungary – Small Cross (1992)
 MOB Golden ring (1995)

References

External links
 
 

1964 births
Canoeists at the 1988 Summer Olympics
Canoeists at the 1992 Summer Olympics
Canoeists at the 1996 Summer Olympics
Hungarian male canoeists
Living people
Olympic canoeists of Hungary
Olympic gold medalists for Hungary
Olympic silver medalists for Hungary
Olympic medalists in canoeing
ICF Canoe Sprint World Championships medalists in kayak
Medalists at the 1992 Summer Olympics
Medalists at the 1988 Summer Olympics
People from Vác
Sportspeople from Pest County
20th-century Hungarian people